Johan Harald Alfred Wallin (27 February 1887 – 16 June 1946) was a Swedish sailor who competed at the 1908 and 1912 Summer Olympics.

In 1908 he was a crew member of the Swedish boat Vinga, which won the silver medal in the 8 metre class. Four years later he was a crew member of the Swedish boat Kitty which won the gold medal in the 10 metre class.

References

1887 births
1946 deaths
Swedish male sailors (sport)
Olympic sailors of Sweden
Sailors at the 1908 Summer Olympics – 8 Metre
Sailors at the 1912 Summer Olympics – 10 Metre
Olympic gold medalists for Sweden
Olympic silver medalists for Sweden
Olympic medalists in sailing
Medalists at the 1908 Summer Olympics
Medalists at the 1912 Summer Olympics
Sportspeople from Gothenburg